Robert Blanchaer (born 22 September 1952) is a Belgian former alpine skier. He competed in the Men's Downhill, Men's Giant Slalom and Men's Slalom events in the 1972 and 1976 Winter Olympics. In addition, he was also the flag bearer for Belgium in the 1972 and 1976 Winter Olympics opening ceremony.

Blancher is currently the coach of Antwerp Ski Team.

References

1952 births
Living people
People from Wilrijk
Belgian male alpine skiers
Olympic alpine skiers of Belgium
Alpine skiers at the 1972 Winter Olympics
Alpine skiers at the 1976 Winter Olympics